Villagrán Municipality is a municipality in Tamaulipas, Mexico.

External links
Gobierno Municipal de Villagrán Official website

Municipalities of Tamaulipas